Márcio de Sousa e Melo (26 May 1906 – 31 January 1991) was a general with the Brazilian Air Force. Melo was one of the military in the joint military board that ruled Brazil between the illness of Artur da Costa e Silva in August 1969 and the investiture ceremony of Emílio Garrastazu Médici in October of that same year.

During the government of the junta, the American Ambassador to Brazil Charles Burke Elbrick was kidnapped by the communist guerilla group Revolutionary Movement 8th October — radical opposition to the military dictatorship.

References

1906 births
1991 deaths
People from Florianópolis
Brazilian Air Force generals
Military dictatorship in Brazil